Oxalobacter formigenes is a Gram negative oxalate-degrading anaerobic bacterium that was first isolated from the gastrointestinal tract of a sheep in 1985. To date, the bacterium has been found to colonizes the large intestines of numerous vertebrates, including humans, and has even been isolated from freshwater sediment. It processes oxalate by decarboxylation into formate (oxalyl-CoA decarboxylase), producing energy for itself in the process.

The broad-spectrum quinolone antibiotics kill O. formigenes. If a person's gastrointestinal (GI) tract lacks this bacterium, and therefore lacks the primary source for the oxalyl-CoA decarboxylase enzyme, then the GI tract cannot degrade dietary oxalates which on digestion get absorbed easily and after some vitamin B6-modulated partial metabolic degradation in the body, is excreted in the kidney, where it precipitates with calcium to form calcium oxalate kidney stones. Oxalobacter formigenes can protect against kidney stones by degrading oxalate.

The role and presence of O. formigenes in the human gut is an area of active research.

Genome 
The genome of O. formigenes has been sequenced by multiple researchers and is revealed to be 2.41 – 2.47 Mb with a G+C content of 49.6%.

Taxonomy 
Based on fatty acid profile, 16S ribosomal RNA sequencing, and DNA probes specific to the oxc (oxalyl-CoA decarboxylase) gene and frc (formyl-CoA transferase), O. formigenes has been divided into two groups. Group 1 has less diversity and better growth compared to group 2. To date, most research has focused on group 1 strains due to their ease of growth.

Interestingly, analysis with the DNA probes showed that group 2 may be further divided into two subgroups. Whole genome sequencing has revealed that the original O. formigenes taxon can be divided into three additional species: Oxalobacter aliiformigenes, Oxalobacter paeniformigenes, and Oxalobacter paraformigenes.

Growth in culture 
O. formigenes was isolated in oxalate containing anerobic media. Currently, O. formigenes is grown in anaerobic Hungate tubes using a CO2-bicarbonate buffered oxalate media. Optimal growth is achieved at a pH between 6 and 7. Oxalate is used at 20 mM for freezer recovery and general maintenance but concentrations can be increased to 100 mM for increased cell density. While oxalate is the main carbon source, small amounts of acetate and yeast extract are supportive of growth. O. formigenes can reach stationary phase in approximately 24 – 48 hours but is sometimes delayed to 72 hours.

Enriched anaerobic complex media (e.g. Brain heart infusion) fail to support the growth of O. formigenes unless supplemented with oxalate. Therefore, these media can be used to assess the purity of O. formigenes cultures.

Antibiotic resistance and susceptibility 
Given the fastidious nature of O. formigenes, traditional methods for antibiotic susceptibility testing are not sufficient. Instead, bacteria are cultured in the presence of antibiotics and screened for viability using opaque anaerobic oxalate agar. This method demonstrated that O. formigenes is resistant to nalidixic acid, ampicillin, amoxicillin, streptomycin, and vancomycin. O. formigenes was also found to be susceptible to ciprofloxacin, clarithromycin, clindamycin, doxycycline, gentamicin, levofloxacin, metronidazole, and tetracycline.

References 

Burkholderiales